Vallerriquito is a corregimiento in Las Tablas District, Los Santos Province, Panama with a population of 277 as of 2010. Its population as of 1990 was 326; its population as of 2000 was 301.

Notable people
Herasto Reyes

References

Corregimientos of Los Santos Province